Pattithanam is a village near Ettumanoor in the Kottayam District of Kerala, India.  Pattithanam village is the point of highest altitude on Main Central Road (MC Road). The early settlers in Pattithanam played a major role in establishing the educational and religious institutions in this area. During the early days, the nearest market was Athirampuzha and the agricultural produce was taken by bullock cart and head load from Pattithanm on market days. Pattithanam village is within Meenachil and Kottayam taluks of Kottayam District of Kerala.

Facilities
Churches: Saint Boniface Church, St. Thomas Church, Ettumanoor Brethren Church, Saint Boniface UP School
Schools: Alphonsa English Medium School, Town U.P. School and Ebenezer international School.

Distance from places 
 Kottayam 
 Ettumanoor 
 Palai (Pala) 
 Kanakkari 
 Ernakulam 
 Perumbavoor 
 Trivandrum

Transportation
The Main Central Road (state highway 1) passes through the village. It is also known for the sharp curves due to the ghat section, and the much delayed Kerala State Transport Project is expected to give some relief from this. State Highway 14 and State Highway 15 start from Pattithanam Junction.

References

Villages in Kottayam district